1-Hexacosanol  is a saturated primary fatty alcohol with a carbon chain length of 26 that is a white waxy solid at room temperature. It is freely soluble in chloroform and insoluble in water. It occurs naturally in the epicuticular wax and plant cuticle of many plant species.

References

Fatty alcohols
Primary alcohols
Alkanols